Derek Tracey (born 6 April 1971 in Dublin) is a retired League of Ireland association footballer  who spent his entire 17 season senior career playing for Shamrock Rovers.

He made his debut on 9 August 1989 against St James's Gate F.C. in the Leinster Senior Cup. Tracey made his League of Ireland debut on 19 November 1989 against Dundalk as a substitute. He got his first start following week in Cork. His first goal was against University College Dublin A.F.C. in a 1-0 win on 13 February 1990. He was the club's top goalscorer in 1994–95 with 8 league goals.

He was ever present in the  1996-97 and 1997-98 seasons.

Derek made his 250th league appearance in a great 3-1 win over Bohemians on 19 September 1999.

On 26 May 2006, Tracey announced his retirement. During his time he made almost 500 senior appearances and as a versatile midfielder played in every position except goalkeeper. He played under 11 managers and scored once in 3 appearances in Europe 

Derek scored 47 goals in 486 competitive appearances for The Hoops.

Derek was honoured with a Testimonial match in Tallaght Stadium on 5 November 2010.

Honours
Shamrock Rovers
 League of Ireland Premier Division
 1993–94 
 FAI Super Cup
 1998
 Leinster Senior Cup
 1997

Sources 
 The Hoops by Paul Doolan and Robert Goggins

References

Living people
1971 births
Republic of Ireland association footballers
Shamrock Rovers F.C. players
Belvedere F.C. players
Association footballers from Dublin (city)
Association football midfielders
League of Ireland players
League of Ireland XI players

External links
 Extended Interview (the42)